The Crow: Stairway to Heaven is a Canadian superhero television series created by Bryce Zabel. It originally aired from September 25, 1998, to May 22, 1999, consisting of only 22 episodes. The series was based on the 1994 film The Crow, which itself was based on James O'Barr's 1989 comic book series of the same name. It starred Mark Dacascos as the protagonist, Eric Draven.

Synopsis
Exactly one year after being brutally murdered, rock musician Eric Draven returns to Earth, searching for a way to right what was wronged and to reunite with his missing soulmate Shelly Webster. Guided by a mystical Spirit Crow, he is neither living nor dead, possessing strange new powers to aid him in his search for revenge which, ultimately, must become a quest for redemption.

Cast

Main cast
Mark Dacascos as Eric Draven/The Crow, Eric was the lead guitarist in rock band Hangman's Joke. Exactly one year after his murder and the rape/murder of his fiancée, Shelly at the hands of T-Bird and his crew, he returns from the dead. Imbued with regenerative powers, heightened strength, and immortality. He seeks to "set the wrong things right", and ultimately return to Shelly and move on to the Land of the Dead.
Marc Gomes as Daryl Albrecht, Albrecht was the detective heading up the Draven-Webster murder investigation and initially thinks Eric may have been responsible for Shelly's death, and then faked his own to escape justice. As the series progresses he begins to trust and befriend Eric; until he becomes an ally in his quest for redemption - even at the risk of damaging his own career.
Sabine Karsenti as Shelly Webster, Shelly was a photographer; who was murdered by T-Bird's crew after getting caught in the wrong place at the wrong time. After Eric is sent back to the Land of the Living, she waits for him, unwilling to move on to the Land of the Dead without him.
Katie Stuart as Sarah Mohr, Argumentative and headstrong, Sarah is a 13-year-old kid with a rough upbringing. She befriends Eric and Shelly; who became parent-like figures to her before their murders. She becomes Eric's closest friend after his return, helping him in any way she can.

Recurring cast
Lynda Boyd as Darla Mohr, Darla is Sarah's mother, and works the front desk at Albrecht's precinct. A recovering alcoholic, her relationship with her daughter is sometimes strained.
Jon Cuthbert as David Vincennes, Vincennes is a police lieutenant and Albrecht's boss. They share a close friendship, although Vincennes "plays by the rules" and is suspicious of Albrecht's relationship with Draven.
Christina Cox as Jessica Capshaw, when Albrecht's relationship with Draven starts to raise eyebrows among his superiors, Capshaw is brought in as his new partner. Young and inexperienced, she often finds herself left out of the loop by Albrecht.
John Pyper-Ferguson as Jason "Top Dollar" Danko, the manager of the Blackout nightclub, Top Dollar ran contract killings for Mace Reyes using T-Bird and his crew as muscle before Draven returned and shut them down. After Draven's return, Top Dollar becomes obsessed with gaining the power of a crow and goes after Draven in order to be killed by him in search of becoming a crow. After being killed by Eric Draven, he appears as a phantom and manifests supernatural powers; waiting till the time comes he will be able to return as a snake.
John Tench as "T-Bird", the leader of a gang of criminals; who serve as muscle for Top Dollar's criminal operations. He leads the gang in killing Eric and Shelley. 
Julie Dreyfus as India Reyes, India was the manager of the Blackout before it was bought by Mace Reyes; who she married. She later resumes her old role, hoping to bring the club back from its dark past.
Gaetana Korbin as Shea Marino, Shea is an employee of the Blackout; who harbors at least a physical attraction to Draven - if not more. It is in the course of helping her escape the attentions of her abusive ex-husband that truly brings Draven to the attention of the law.
Suleka Mathew as Cordelia Warren, Albrecht's girlfriend, and Port Columbia's District Attorney, Cordelia is strong-willed and intolerant of the kind of vigilante-style tactics Draven utilizes. Albrecht's friendship with Draven ultimately causes problems between him and Cordelia.
Ty Olsson as George "Funboy" Jamieson, one of T-Bird's crew, Funboy was Darla's boyfriend; until Draven's return. Even after finding religion and repenting for his sins, he finds himself as a pawn working against Draven. He was later killed by the dark version of the Crow.
Darcy Laurie as Mark "Tin-Tin" Tremayne, one of T-Bird's minions. He is the one who uses his throwing knives to attack Eric Draven in the alleyway. He hangs out with the gang.
Kadeem Hardison as Skull Cowboy, cryptic with a dark sense of humor, the Skull Cowboy is a guide in the Land of the Living for all the "poor souls" like Draven who find themselves in the limbo between life and death. Although he is a bystander for the most part; allowing each course of action to play itself out, he is willing to get involved in certain situations.
Bobbie Phillips as Hannah Foster/Talon, like Draven, Hannah has returned from death to put the wrong things right. However, unlike Draven; Hannah constantly struggles between the need for redemption and her lust for vengeance on the men who murdered her and her daughter. Even afterwards, her methods are far more vicious than Draven's.

Guests cast
Mark Rolston as Mace Reyes, a corrupt businessman and a snake.
Glenn Morshower as Falcon, a corrupt FBI agent working for the Mafia.
John Hawkes as Jake Thompson, a suicidal stunt motorcyclist.
Corey Feldman as Chris Draven, Eric's estranged half-brother.
Anthony Michael Hall as Reid Truax, a serial killer.

Episodes

Production

Filming locations
Production took place in and around Vancouver, British Columbia, which in the series was named Port Columbia. Several scenes were filmed inside the top floors of the Sun Tower, and at the BC Museum of Mining in Britannia Beach.

Music
As with each of the movie adaptations and the original comic book, underground music played a key role in the show. Bands such as Econoline Crush and Mudgirl made guest appearances on the show, while the source music included tracks by Rob Zombie, The Crystal Method, Delerium, Bif Naked, The Painkillers, Oleander, and Xero). Two tracks from Peter Himmelman's 1998 album Love Thinketh No Evil, "Fly So High" and "Seven Circles", were re-recorded for use by Eric Draven's band, Hangman's Joke, with the latter song becoming a major plot point during the early episodes of the series.

Accidents
A special effects explosion went wrong during filming on August 15, 1998, when stuntman Marc Akerstream was struck on the head and killed by flying debris.

Cancellation
Despite positive reviews and decent ratings, the series was cancelled after one season in June 1999, when Polygram was sold to Universal Studios, which decided not to continue Stairway to Heaven. The producers planned to make a television movie to wrap up the major loose ends from the cliffhanger at the end of the final episode, but it never materialized.

Later Bryce Zabel said than he planned to make a 6-hour miniseries  to wrap up the show. According to him, Eric was going to be picked up five years after the event of the season one finale.

Broadcast
In 1999 and 2000, the series was aired extensively on The Sci-Fi Channel in the United States and the United Kingdom. In March 2010, CBS Action in the UK aired the series.

DVD releases
On March 17, 2005, all 22 episodes were released in a 5-disc DVD boxed set in central Europe through Dutch distributor A-Film. The set features the original broadcast trailer, a behind-the-scenes featurette, and interview snippets with cast members Mark Dacascos, Marc Gomes, Sabine Karsenti, Katie Stuart and John Pyper-Ferguson, fight co-ordinator James Lew, crow handler Dave Sousa, director of photography Attila Szaly, and executive producers Bryce Zabel and Brad Markowitz.

2005 also saw a bare-bones episode-only release of the series in Australia on six discs across two volumes via Warner Bros.; this release was preceded by an even more basic single disc through Magna Pacific which featured the pilot and two "bonus" episodes.

On July 24, 2007, Arts Alliance America released The Crow: Stairway to Heaven - The Complete Series in a 5-disc DVD set in Region 1 (US only). This set features an extensive array of special features including commentaries, a photo gallery and a gag reel.

On February 15, 2011, Alliance Home Entertainment released The Complete Series on DVD in Canada only.

Awards and nominations

References

External links

First-run syndicated television shows in Canada
1998 Canadian television series debuts
1999 Canadian television series endings
1990s Canadian drama television series
Television shows based on comics
Television series based on adaptations
Live action television shows based on films
Television series by Universal Television
Television series by Alliance Atlantis
Television shows filmed in Vancouver
Dark fantasy television series
Canadian superhero television series
The Crow